Many federal agencies have their headquarters or other large installations in Maryland.

Civilian

Military 

Buildings and structures in Maryland
Lists of buildings and structures in Maryland